Marquis Hayes Jr. (born February 14, 1999) is an American football offensive guard for the Arizona Cardinals of the National Football League (NFL). He played college football at Oklahoma.

Early life and high school
Hayes grew up in St. Louis, Missouri and attended Pattonville High School in Maryland Heights, Missouri. He did not play on the varsity football team until his junior year. Hayes was rated a four-star recruit and committed to play college football at Oklahoma over offers from Miami, Missouri, Illinois, Iowa State, and Minnesota.

College career
Hayes redshirted his true freshman season at Oklahoma. He played in three games as a reserve offensive lineman during his redshirt freshman season. Hayes became the Sooners' starting left guard going into his redshirt sophomore season and started all 13 of Oklahoma's games. He moved to right guard and started 11 games during the Sooners' COVID-19-shortened 2020 season. After considering entering the 2021 NFL Draft, Hayes decided to return to Oklahoma for his redshirt senior season. He moved back to left guard and started all 13 of Oklahoma's games. After the end of the season, Hayes declared that he would be entering the 2022 NFL Draft.

Professional career

Hayes was drafted by the Arizona Cardinals in the seventh round (257th overall) of the 2022 NFL Draft. He was placed on injured reserve on August 30, 2022.

References

External links
 Arizona Cardinals bio
Oklahoma Sooners bio

1999 births
Living people
Players of American football from St. Louis
American football offensive guards
Oklahoma Sooners football players
Arizona Cardinals players